This page lists the winners for the BAFTA Award for Best Documentary, formerly known as the Robert Flaherty Documentary Award, for each year.

History
The British Academy of Film and Television Arts (BAFTA), is a British organisation that hosts annual awards shows for film, television, children's film and television, and interactive media. A theatrical documentary award was presented by the Academy between 1948 and 1990. Documentaries have continued to be honoured with British Academy Television Awards since then and have been eligible in all relevant categories at the Film Awards. In 2012, the Academy re-introduced this category in recognition of the number of high-quality theatrical documentaries released in cinemas in the UK each year.

Winners and nominees

1940s

1950s

1960s

1970s

1980s

2010s

2020s

See also
Academy Award for Best Documentary Feature
Golden Globe Award for Best Documentary Film
Academy Award for Best Documentary Short Subject
British Academy Television Award for Best Single Documentary

References

External links
 BAFTA official site

British Academy Film Awards
British documentary film awards